The 2017–18 Rice Owls men's basketball team represented Rice University during the 2017–18 NCAA Division I men's basketball season. The Owls, led by first-year head coach Scott Pera, played their home games at Tudor Fieldhouse in Houston, Texas as members of Conference USA. They finished the season 7–24, 4–14 in C-USA play to finish in 13th place and failed to qualify for the C-USA tournament.

Previous season
The Owls finished the 2016–17 season 23–12, 11–7 in C-USA play to finish in fifth place. They defeated Southern Miss in the first round of the C-USA tournament before losing in the quarterfinals to UTEP. They received an invitation to the College Basketball Invitational where they defeated San Francisco in the first round before losing in the quarterfinals to Utah Valley.

On March 21, 2017, head coach Mike Rhoades resigned to become the head coach at VCU. He finished at Rice with a three-year record of 47–52. On March 23, the school promoted assistant coach Scott Pera to head coach.

Offseason

Departures

Incoming transfers

2017 recruiting class

2018 recruiting class

Roster

Schedule and results

|-
!colspan=9 style=|Exhibition

|-
!colspan=9 style=|Non-conference regular season

|-
!colspan=12 style=| Conference USA regular season

See also
2017–18 Rice Owls women's basketball team

References

Rice Owls men's basketball seasons
Rice